Daniel Francis Ahern (February 15, 1898 - August 31, 1963) was an American football offensive tackle who played one season in the American Professional Football Association (APFA) for the Washington Senators. He played 3 games and started 2.

References

Washington Senators (NFL) players
1898 births
1963 deaths
American football tackles
Players of American football from New Hampshire
Manchester Central High School alumni
Georgetown University alumni